Inverness Airport  is a public use airport located two nautical miles (4 km) southeast of the central business district of Inverness, a city in Citrus County, Florida, United States. The airport is owned by Citrus County and contains an aviation unit of the Citrus County Sheriff's Office. It is also located next to the Citrus County Speedway.

Although most U.S. airports use the same three-letter location identifier for the FAA and IATA, this airport is assigned INF by the FAA but has no designation from the IATA (which assigned INF to In Guezzam Airport in Algeria).

Facilities and aircraft 
Inverness Airport covers an area of 354 acres (143 ha) at an elevation of 65 feet (20 m) above mean sea level. It has one runway designated 1/19 with an asphalt surface measuring 5,000 by 75 feet (1,524 x 23 m).

For the 12-month period ending April 19, 2010, the airport had 15,000 general aviation aircraft operations, an average of 41 per day. At that time there were 29 aircraft based at this airport: 86% single-engine, 3% multi-engine, and 10% helicopter.

References

External links 
 Inverness Airport at Citrus County website
 Inverness Airport brochure (PDF) from Continuing Florida Aviation System Planning Process (CFASPP)
 Aerial image as of January 1999 from USGS The National Map
 

Airports in Florida
Transportation buildings and structures in Citrus County, Florida